Carel Willem Hendrik Boshoff (usually written as Carel Boshoff IV), is a South African politician and writer known for being the leader of the Afrikaner whites-only town Orania.

He was also the provincial leader from 2003 to 2015 of the Freedom Front Plus party in Northern Cape province.

Biography 
He was born in 1963, the son of Carel Boshoff, the founder of Orania. He majored in science at the University of Pretoria, on which he had written a doctoral thesis in 1992 called "Afrikaners na Apartheid" ("Afrikaners after Apartheid").

Orania 
Son of Orania's founder, he was the leader of the Orania movement from 2007 until 2019. In 2016, he became mayor of Orania but three years later, on 27 May 2019, he resigned due to corruption allegations, which he denied.

See also 

 Carel Boshoff
 Orania, Northern Cape
 Freedom Front Plus

References 

1963 births
Living people
Afrikaner people
Freedom Front Plus politicians
South African writers
People from Pretoria
University of Pretoria alumni
Academic staff of the University of Pretoria
Orania, Northern Cape